Trachyderini is a tribe of long-horned beetles in the family Cerambycidae. There are at least 140 genera and 650 described species in Trachyderini.

Selected genera

 Aegoidus 
 Aethecerinus Fall & Cockerell, 1907
 Allopeplus 
 Amannus LeConte, 1858
 Amphionthe 
 Ancylocera Audinet-Serville, 1834
 Ancylosternus 
 Andrachydes 
 Andraegoidus 
 Assycuera 
 Athetesis 
 Axestoleus 
 Batyle Thomson, 1864
 Callancyla 
 Callona Waterhouse, 1840
 Ceragenia 
 Ceralocyna 
 Cercoptera 
 Cervilissa 
 Charinotes 
 Chemsakia 
 Chemsakiella Monné, 2006
 Chevrolatella 
 Chlorotherion 
 Chydarteres 
 Cosmocerus 
 Crioprosopus Audinet-Serville, 1834
 Crossidius LeConte, 1851
 Cryptobias 
 Ctenodes 
 Cyphosterna 
 Deltaspis Audinet-Serville, 1834
 Dendrobias Dupont, 1834
 Deretrachys 
 Desmoderus 
 Dicranoderes 
 Dorcacerus 
 Drychateres 
 Elytroleptus Duges, 1879
 Entomosterna 
 Eriocharis 
 Eriphus 
 Exallancyla 
 Galissus 
 Gambria 
 Giesbertella 
 Giesbertia 
 Gonyacantha 
 Gortonia 
 Hoegea 
 Hudepohlellus 
 Ischnocnemis 
 Lissonomimus 
 Lissonoschema 
 Lissonotypus 
 Lophalia Casey, 1912
 Mannophorus LeConte, 1854
 Martinsellus 
 Megaderus Dejean, 1821
 Megapurpuricenus Eya
 Metaleptus Bates, 1872
 Metopocoilus 
 Micropelta 
 Mimonneticus 
 Molitones 
 Monneellus 
 Muscidora 
 Neochrysoprasis 
 Neocrossidius 
 Neogalissus 
 Neotaphos 
 Neotaranomis 
 Noguerana 
 Nothoprodontia 
 Oxymerus Dupont in Audinet-Serville, 1834
 Ozodera 
 Palaeotrachyderes 
 Parabatyle 
 Paraethecerus 
 Paragortonia 
 Parathetesis 
 Parevander Aurivillius, 1912
 Paroxoplus 
 Parozodera 
 Perarthrus LeConte, 1851
 Phaedinus 
 Phimosia 
 Phoenidnus 
 Pilostenaspis Eya
 Placoschema Chemsak & Hovore, 2010
 Pleuromenus 
 Plionoma Casey, 1912
 Poecilopeplus 
 Polyschisis 
 Prodontia 
 Pseudodeltaspis 
 Pseudoeriphus 
 Pseudophimosia 
 Pseudostenaspis 
 Pteracantha 
 Pteroplatidius 
 Purpuricenus Dejean, 1821
 Rachidion 
 Retrachydes 
 Rhodoleptus Linsley, 1962
 Schizax LeConte, 1873
 Scythroleus 
 Seabraellus 
 Seabraia 
 Seabriella 
 Sphaenothecus Dupont, 1838
 Steinheilia 
 Stenaspis Audinet-Serville, 1834
 Stenobatyle 
 Sternacanthus 
 Stiphilus 
 Streptolabis 
 Tamenes 
 Trachelissa 
 Trachyderes Dalman in Schoenherr, 1817
 Trachyderomorpha 
 Tragidion Audinet-Serville, 1834
 Triacetelus 
 Tuberorachidion 
 Tylosis LeConte, 1850
 Unachlorus 
 Weyrauchia 
 Xylocaris 
 Zalophia 
 Zenochloris 
 Zonotylus

References

Further reading

 
 
 
 
 

 
Cerambycinae
Beetle tribes